Strophaeus is a genus of brushed trapdoor spiders first described by Anton Ausserer in 1875.

Species
 it contains four species:
Strophaeus austeni (F. O. Pickard-Cambridge, 1896) – Brazil
Strophaeus kochi (O. Pickard-Cambridge, 1870) (type) – Peru
Strophaeus pentodon (Simon, 1892) – Brazil
Strophaeus sebastiani Miranda & Bermúdez, 2010 – Panama

References

Barychelidae
Mygalomorphae genera
Spiders of South America
Taxa named by Anton Ausserer